Little Eaton is a civil parish in the Borough of Erewash, Derbyshire, England.  The parish contains 15 listed buildings that are recorded in the National Heritage List for England.   All the listed buildings are designated at Grade II, the lowest of the three grades, which is applied to "buildings of national importance and special interest".  The parish contains the village of Little Eaton and the surrounding area.  Most of the listed buildings are houses, farmhouses and farm buildings.  The other listed buildings include a church and its lychgate, a former malthouse, a public house and attached coach house, and a parish room.


Buildings

References

Citations

Sources

 

Lists of listed buildings in Derbyshire